Kaada/Patton Live is a DVD of the collaboration between Mike Patton and John Kaada that was released on November 20, 2007.  The DVD features a live performance of the music from the album Romances from Roskilde Festival 2005. The video is in black & white.

Track listing 
 "Legless Liss"
 "Invocation"
 "Pitié Pour Mes Larmes"
 "Aubade"
 "L'Absent"
 "Crépuscule"
 "Viens, Les Gazons Sont Verts"
 "Seule"
 "Pensée Des Morts"
 "Nuit Silencieuse"
 "The Cloroform Theme"

Extras 
 Rehearsal Film
 Photo gallery

Personnel 

 Erland Dahlen - Percussion, xylophone, vocals
 Børge Fjordheim - Drums, vocals
 Hallvard Wennersberg Hagen - Electronics
 John Erik Kaada - Keyboards, vocals, producer
 Mike Patton - Electronics, percussion, vocals
 Øyvind Storesund - Bass, whistling
 Geir Sundstøl - Guitar, lapsteel guitar, vocals

References

Kaada video albums
Mike Patton video albums
Ipecac Recordings live albums
2007 video albums
2007 live albums
Live video albums
Ipecac Recordings video albums
Collaborative albums